was a planned autobahn in Germany, supposed to connect Feuchtwangen with Füssen. Parts of the planned construction have been carried out as Bundesstraße 2 and Bundesstraße 17, however further building activities were postponed.

Exit list 

|-
|colspan="3"|

 
|built as 

|-
|colspan="3"|

 
|built as 

 

 (2009)
 (2009) 
 (2009)
 (2009)

|-
|colspan="3"|

|built as 

|-
|colspan="3"|

|built as 

|-
|colspan="3"|

|built as 
  
 

|}

External links 

91
A091
A091
Proposed roads in Germany